The Battle of Ciudad Juárez may refer to:
Battle of Ciudad Juárez (1911)
Battle of Ciudad Juárez (1913)
Battle of Ciudad Juárez (1919)